Carole Monnet (born 1 December 2001) is a Ukrainian-born French tennis player.

Monnet has career-high WTA rankings of 188 in singles, achieved on 27 February 2023, and 353 in doubles, reached on 18 April 2022.

Career
She made her WTA Tour main-draw debut at the 2021 Ladies Open Lausanne, where she received a wildcard into the doubles tournament.

Her first singles tour-level main-draw match was at the 2022 Internationaux de Strasbourg.

She received a wildcard for the main draw in singles at the 2022 French Open for her home Grand Slam debut.

Personal life
Monnet was born in Ukraine and was adopted at age two by French parents living in Toulouse.

Grand Slam singles performance timeline

ITF Circuit finals

Singles: 14 (8 titles, 6 runner–ups)

Doubles: 6 (2 titles, 4 runner–ups)

References

External links
 
 

2001 births
Living people
French female tennis players